Fusional languages or inflected languages are a type of synthetic language, distinguished from agglutinative languages by their tendency to use a single inflectional morpheme to denote multiple grammatical, syntactic, or semantic features. 

For example, the Spanish verb comer ("to eat") has the first-person singular preterite tense form comí ("I ate"); the single suffix -í represents both the features of first-person singular agreement and preterite tense, instead of having a separate affix for each feature.

Another illustration of fusionality is the Latin word  ("good"). The ending  denotes masculine gender, nominative case, and singular number. Changing any one of these features requires replacing the suffix  with a different one. In the form , the ending  denotes masculine accusative singular, neuter accusative singular, or neuter nominative singular.

Indo-European languages 

Examples of fusional Indo-European languages include: the Balto-Slavic languages (including Polish, Russian, and Ukrainian) with the exception of Bulgarian and Macedonian which are partially analytic; Sanskrit, Pashto, modern Indo-Aryan languages (such as Hindustani, Kashmiri, and Punjabi); Greek (classical and modern), Latin, Italian, French, Spanish,  Portuguese and  Romanian; Irish, German,  Faroese,  Icelandic, and Albanian.

Caucasian languages 

Northeast Caucasian languages are weakly fusional.

Semitic languages 
Another notable group of fusional languages is the Semitic languages group; however, Modern Hebrew is much more analytic than Classical Hebrew "both with nouns and with verbs". 

Colloquial varieties of Arabic are more analytic than modern standard Arabic, having lost all noun declensions, and in many cases also featuring simplified conjugation.

Uralic languages 

A limited degree of fusion is also found in many Uralic languages, like Hungarian, Estonian, Finnish, and the Sami languages, such as Skolt Sami, as these languages are primarily agglutinative.

Outside Eurasia

Americas 

Unusual for a natively North American language, Navajo is sometimes described as fusional due to its complex and inseparable verb morphology.

Some Amazonian languages (such as Ayoreo) have fusional morphology.

The Fuegian language Selk'nam has fusional elements. For example, both evidentiality and gender agreement are coded with a single suffix on the verb:

CERT:certainty (evidential):evidentiality

Africa 
Some Nilo-Saharan languages such as Lugbara are also considered fusional.

History 
Fusional languages generally tend to lose their inflection over the centuriessome languages much more quickly than others.

Loss of fusionality

While Proto-Indo-European was fusional, some of its descendants have shifted to a more analytic structure, such as Modern English, Danish and Afrikaans, or agglutinative, such as Persian and Armenian. 

Other descendants remain fusional, including Sanskrit, Ancient Greek, Lithuanian, Latvian, Slavic languages, as well as Latin and the Romance languages and certain Germanic languages.

Gain of fusionality
Some languages shift over time from agglutinative to fusional. 

For example, while most Uralic languages are predominantly agglutinative, Estonian is markedly evolving in the direction of a fusional language. On the other hand, Finnish, its close relative, exhibits fewer fusional traits, thereby keeping closer to the mainstream Uralic type. However, Sámi languages, also part of the Uralic family, have gained more fusionality than Finnish and Estonian, not just involving consonant gradation but also vowel apophony.

Declension

One feature of many fusional languages is their systems of declensions. Here nouns and adjectives have a suffix attached to them to specify grammatical case (their uses in the clause), number, and grammatical gender; pronouns may alter their forms entirely to encode this information. 

Within a fusional language, there are usually more than one declension; Latin and Greek have five, and Slavic languages have anywhere between three and seven. German has multiple based on whatever vowel or consonant the word ends with and can often be unpredictable.

However, many descendants of fusional languages tend to lose their case marking. In most Romance and Germanic languages, including modern English (with the notable exceptions of German and Icelandic), encoding for case is merely vestigial; this is because it no longer encompasses nouns and adjectives, but only pronouns.

Compare the Italian egli (masculine singular nominative), gli (masculine singular dative, or indirect object), lo (masculine singular accusative) and lui (also masculine singular accusative, but emphatic and indirect case to be used with prepositions), corresponding to the single vestigial pair he, him in English.

Conjugation

Conjugation is the alteration of the form of a verb to encode information about some or all of grammatical mood, voice, tense, aspect, person, grammatical gender, and number. In a fusional language, two or more of these pieces of information may be conveyed in a single morpheme, typically a suffix.

For example, in French, the verbal suffix depends on the mood, tense, and aspect of the verb, as well as on the person and number (but not the gender) of its subject. This gives rise to typically forty-five different single-word forms of the verb, each conveying some or all of the following:
mood (indicative, subjunctive, conditional, or imperative)
tense (past, present or future)
aspect (perfective or imperfective)
person (first, second, or third), and
number (singular or plural). 

To change any one of these pieces of information without changing the others requires using a different suffix, the key characteristic of fusionality.

English has two examples of conjugational fusion. The verbal suffix -s indicates a combination of present tense with both third person and singularity of the associated subject, and the verbal suffix -ed, used in a verb with no auxiliary verb, conveys both non-progressive aspect and past tense.

See also
 Inflection
 Synthetic language

References

 
Synthetic languages

eo:Lingva tipologio#Aglutinaj kaj fandaj lingvoj